Şahin ( Iranian: , Shāhīn) is a Turkish and Tatar name of Iranian origin that means falcon.  Notable people with the name include:

Surname
 Ali Şahin (wrestler) (born 1944), Turkish wrestler 
 Arif Sahin (born 1985), Turkish footballer 
 Asiye Özlem Şahin (born 1976), Turkish-German boxer
 Ayşe Şahin, Turkish-American mathematician
Bekir Şahin, Turkish jurist and judge
Canan Şahin (born 1970), Turkish-Kurdish multidisciplinary visual artist, activist
 Celal Şahin (1925–2018), Turkish musician and humorist
 Cenk Şahin (born 1994), Turkish footballer
 Ercan Şahin (born 1971), Turkish folk musician.
 Fatma Şahin (born 1966), Turkish politician
 Fatma Şahin (footballer) (born 1990), Turkish footballer
 Hafize Şahin, Turkish sport wrestler
 Hülya Şahin, Turkish boxer
 İbrahim Şahin (born 1956), Turkish police chief
 İbrahim Şahin (footballer) (born 1984), Turkish footballer
 İdris Naim Şahin (born 1956), Turkish politician 
 İrem Damla Şahin (born 2000), Turkish footballer
 Kemal Şahin, Turkish entrepreneur
 Kenan Şahin, Turkish footballer
 Mehmet Ali Şahin, Turkish politician
 Metin Şahin (born 1963), European champion Turkish former taekwondo practitioner
 Murat Şahin, Turkish footballer
 Nihat Şahin, Turkish footballer
 Nuri Şahin, Turkish footballer
 Nuri Şahin (volleyball) (born 1980), Turkish volleyball player
 Ramazan Şahin, Turkish freestyle wrestler
 Reyhan Şahin (born 1980 or 1981), German-speaking rapper, radio host and actor of Turkish ethnicity
 Selçuk Şahin (footballer born 1981), Turkish footballer
 Selçuk Şahin (footballer, born 1983), Turkish footballer
 Selin Şahin (born 1992), Turkish wheelchair basketball player
 Serkan Şahin (born 1988), Turkish footballer 
 Sıla Şahin, German-born actress of Turkish descent
 Timuçin Şahin (born 1973), Turkish jazz guitarist
 Turgut Doğan Şahin (born 1988), Turkish footballer
 Tülin Şahin (born 1980), Turkish-Danish top model, television presenter, fashion designer, author, and actress
 Uğur Şahin (born 1965), Turkish-German physician, immunologist and CEO of BioNTech
 Vasip Şahin (born 1964), Turkish civil servant
 Yasemin Şahin (born 1988), Turkish handball player

Given name
 Şahin Aygüneş, Turkish footballer
 Şahin Giray (1745-1787), last khan of Crimea
 Şahin Şenoduncu (born 1994), Turkish race walker
 Şahin Yakut, Turkish kickboxer

See also
 Tofaş Şahin, an automobile sold by Tofaş

Shahin, that also includes listings for Shaheen and Chahine

Turkish-language surnames
Turkish masculine given names